Thangamani Matriculation Higher Secondary School is a Matriculation School. It is located in Pattabiram, Chennai, Tamil Nadu, India. It is one of the oldest schools in the region, founded in 1984. The School emphasises on an all round growth of a student. The school is affiliated to Matriculation system of Tamil Nadu until class 10 and the Tamil Nadu State Board for classes 11 and 12. Academically the school has been very consistent providing excellent results with its children topping in the area.

References

High schools and secondary schools in Chennai
Education in Tiruvallur district